Rebecca Goss may refer to:
 Rebecca Goss (poet)
 Rebecca Goss (chemist)